Astrapometis is a monotypic snout moth genus described by Edward Meyrick in 1884. It contains the species Astrapometis saburalis described by Francis Walker in 1859. It is found in Australia.

References

Epipaschiinae
Monotypic moth genera
Moths of Australia
Pyralidae genera